Brunei national under-23 football team (also known as Brunei Under-23, Brunei U-23 or Brunei Olympic Team) represents Brunei in international football competitions in Olympic Games, Asian Games and SEA Games, as well as any other under-23 international football tournaments.

Kit 
The traditional color of Brunei's home kit is (Yellow shirts, Black shorts and Black socks) and the away kit is either (Red shirt, Black shorts and Red Socks) or Green with a White sash. From 2000 to 2002, their away kits were green at 2001 SEA Games. From 2010 to 2012, their away kits were red shirt, black shorts and red socks at 2011 SEA Games.  From 2016 onwards, their away kits are white. 

Their home kit color yellow-black-black can be described as Tebuan (The hornets) and the away color Red-black-red means courage and blood. Green means nature, peace and Islam, and White means Purity.

Tournament records

Olympic Games

Asian Games 

 Since 2002, football at the Asian Games changes into an Under-23 tournament.

SEA Games 

 Since 2001, football at the Southeast Asian Games changes into Under-23 tournament.

AFC U-23 Championship Record

*Denotes draws include knockout matches decided on penalty kicks.

Fixtures and results

2022 AFF U-23 Youth Championship

Coaching staff

Squad

Current squad 
Squad for the 2022 AFF U-23 Youth Championship held in Cambodia from 14 to 26 February.

Coaches
  Choi Yeong-joon (2001)
  Dayem Ali (2011)
  Kwon Oh-son (2013)
  Stephen Ng Heng Seng (2015)
  Kwon Oh-son (2017)
  Stephen Ng Heng Seng (2019)
  Aminuddin Jumat (2019–)

See also 
 Brunei national football team

References 

Asian national under-23 association football teams
 u23